Committee for State Security of the Moldavian Soviet Socialist Republic (Russian: Комитет государственной безопасности Mолдавский ССР), also referred to as the KGB of the MSSR or the CSS of Moldavia, was the security agency of the Moldavian Soviet Socialist Republic, being the local branch of Committee for State Security of the USSR. On 9 September 1991, the KGB of the MSSR was transformed into the Ministry of National Security (now the Information and Security Service of the Republic of Moldova). Established in 1954, its rights were limited by the early 1960s, with the KGB border guard, once subordinated to the Moldavian KGB, reported directly to party leaders in Moscow. From July 1972 to its disbandment, the KGB was part of the Council of Ministers of the MSSR. From 1940 to 1991, all chairmen of the KGB were army generals. Today, modern Moldovan intelligence services are mostly based on the structure of the KGB, specifically its 5th Division.

Structure 
Structure:

Leadership (chairman, vice chairs, party committee)
Secretariat
1st Division (intelligence)
2nd Division (counterintelligence)
4th Division (secret-political)
5th Division (economic)
7th Division (surveillance)
8th Division (encryption-decryption)
9th Division (protection of party and government leaders)
2nd Special Department 
3rd Special Department 
4th Special Department 
5th Special Department 
Manufacturing Department
Communication Department 
Investigation Department
Archive Department
Prison Department
Human Resources Department
Mobilization Department
Auxiliary units

Notable people investigated by the KGB 
Alexandru Şoltoianu – Founder of the National Patriotic Front
 Gheorghe Ghimpu – Romanian politician and political prisoner
 Valeriu Graur
 Alexandru Usatiuc-Bulgăr
 Sergiu Rădăuţan – Rector of the Chişinău Polytechnical Institute
 Nicolae Testemiţanu – Rector of the Chişinău State Medical Institute
 Boris Alexandru Găină – First Secretary of the Teleneshty Regional Committee of the CPM

Chairmen 
 Iosif Mordovets (May 6, 1954 – March 30, 1955)
 Andrei Prokopenko (March 30, 1955 – July 11, 1959)
 Ivan Savchenko (1959–1967)
 Piotr Chvertko (1967–1975) 
 Arkady Ragozin (December 17, 1975 – January 19, 1979) 
 Gavriil Volkov (January 19, 1979 – January 23, 1989),
 Georgiy Lavranchuk (January 23, 1989 – June 23, 1990),
 Fyodor Botnar (June 23, 1990 – August 29, 1991) 
 Anatoly Plagara (August 29, 1991)

References 

Moldavian Soviet Socialist Republic
KGB